John A. Murphy (August 6, 1932 – 	January 9, 2021) was a former American football player and coach.  He served as the head coach at Heidelberg University in Tiffin, Ohio in 1970 and at the University of Toledo from 1971 to 1976, compiling a career college football record of 38–38.

Head coaching record

Football

References

1932 births
Living people
Heidelberg Student Princes baseball coaches
Heidelberg Student Princes football coaches
Heidelberg Student Princes football players
Toledo Rockets football coaches